The Myanmar Academy of Arts and Science (abbreviated MAAS) is Myanmar's national academy of sciences and humanities.

The academy convenes an annual research conference. MAAS also publishes a research journal, the Journal of the Myanmar Academy of Arts and Science.

Leadership
MAAS' chairman is Than Oo. Its vice-chairman is Kyi Kyi Hla.

References

National academies of arts and humanities
National academies of sciences
Learned societies of Myanmar
National academies
Educational organisations based in Myanmar